The Robinson–Macken House is a historic home in west downtown Austin, Texas. The home is located at 702 Rio Grande. It was added to the National Register of Historic Places in 1985.

Houses in Austin, Texas
Houses completed in 1876
Recorded Texas Historic Landmarks
City of Austin Historic Landmarks
National Register of Historic Places in Austin, Texas
Houses on the National Register of Historic Places in Texas